The 2016 Pac-12 Conference men's basketball tournament was the postseason men's basketball tournament for the Pac-12. It was played between March 9th through March 12th at the MGM Grand Garden Arena in Paradise, Nevada. The champion, the Oregon Ducks, received an automatic bid to the 2016 NCAA tournament.

Seeds
Teams seeded by conference record, with ties broken by record between the tied teams followed by record against the regular-season champion, if necessary.

Schedule

Bracket

* denotes each overtime period played

All-tournament team
Dillon Brooks, Oregon
Chris Boucher, Oregon
Elgin Cook, Oregon
Tyler Dorsey, Oregon
Ivan Rabb, California
Jakob Poeltl, Utah

Most outstanding player
Elgin Cook, Oregon

Hall of Honor inductees

 Salim Stoudamire (Arizona)
 Art Becker (Arizona  State) 
 Brian Hendrick (California) 
 Scott Wedman (Colorado)
 Luke Ridnour (Oregon)
 Jim Anderson (Oregon State)
 Kim Belton (Stanford)
 Keith Erickson (UCLA) 
 Sam Clancy (USC)
 Vern Gardner (Utah)
 Isaiah Thomas (Washington)
 Keith Morrison (Washington State)

References

Pac-12 Conference men's basketball tournament
2015–16 Pac-12 Conference men's basketball season
Pac-12 Conference men's basketball tournament
Pac-12 Conference men's basketball tournament, 2016
College basketball tournaments in Nevada